Pascale Etchemendy (born 6 June 1966) is a French former professional tennis player.

Etchemendy featured in the main draw of six French Open tournaments, making the second round on three occasions. At the 1986 French Open she lost a second round match to 13th seed Carling Bassett, having led 5–3 in the third set. In 1990 she also played in the main draws of the Australian Open and Wimbledon. She had a career high singles ranking of 132 in the world and her best WTA Tour performance was a semi-final appearance at the Taranto in 1990.

ITF finals

Singles (1–1)

Doubles (1–2)

References

External links
 
 

1966 births
Living people
French female tennis players
20th-century French women